Jinzhushan Town is a rural town in Lengshuijiang, Loudi City, Hunan Province, People's Republic of China.

Administrative division
The town is divided into 12 villages and 6 communities, the following areas: Pingtang Community, Jinzhushan Community, Mushan'ao Community, Taizhushan Community, Taizhong Community, Jinshan Community, Dangzheng Village, Dongfeng Village, Heping Village, Hengxing Village, Jinzhu Village, Maxi Village, Taizhong Village, Xintian Village, Yangqiao Village, Yangyuan Village, Zhenxing Village, and Zijiang Village (坪塘社区、金竹山社区、木山坳社区、太主山社区、太中社区、金山社区、当正村、东风村、合坪村、恒星村、金竹村、麻溪村、太中村、新田村、杨桥村、杨源村、振兴村、资江村).

Geography
Zi River, also known as the mother river, winds through the town.

Transportation

Railway
The Shanghai–Kunming railway, from Shanghai to Kunming, southwest China's Yunnan province, through the town.

Provincial Highway
The Provincial Highway S312, commonly abbreviated as "S312", passing across the town east to northwest.

References

Divisions of Lengshuijiang